Palace Springs is a 1991 live/studio album by the English space rock group Hawkwind.

Although released in 1991, this album was recorded in 1989 prior to the previous album Space Bandits. The first two tracks had been recorded with a mobile studio, while the remainder were recorded during a tour of North America.

Background
The live tracks were recorded during the band's 1989 tour of North America, their first tour there since the late 1970s. The Minneapolis show was issued as a double CD in 2008 by Voiceprint.

Set
The full set typically ran as "Magnu", "Down Through The Night", "Treadmill", "Time We Left"/"Heads", "Hassan I Sabbah", "Wind Of Change", "Assault and Battery", "The Golden Void", "Back In The Box"/"Arrival In Utopia", "Brainstorm", "Dream Worker" and "Damnation Alley" with an encore of "Needle Gun" and/or "Ejection".

Tour dates
24 September: Toronto, Diamond
26 September: Washington, 9:30 Club
27 September: Sommerville, Johnny D's
28 September: New York, New Ritz
29 September: Ardmore, 23 East Cabaret
30 September: Cleveland, Phantasy Theater
1 October: Chicago, Lounge Axe
3 October: Milwaukee, Odd Rock Cafe
4 October: Minneapolis, First Avenue
7 October: San Francisco, Stone
9 October: Santa Clara, One Step Beyond
10 October: Los Angeles, Palace
12 October: San Diego, Bacchanal

Atomhenge bonus CD tracks 1-11 was released in USA as California Branstorm in July 1992 (Iloki – ILCD1014), and in UK December 1994 (Cyclops – CYCL-015) including track 12 as a bonus track.

Track listing

Side 1
"Back in the Box" (Harvey Bainbridge, Dave Brock, Alan Davey, Bridget Wishart) – 6:21
"Treadmill" (Brock) – 8:09
"Assault and Battery" [listed as "Lives of Great Men"] (Brock) – 3:26
"The Golden Void" [listed as "Void of Golden Light"] (Brock) – 6:51

Side 2
"Time We Left (This World Today)" (Brock) / "Heads" (Brock, Roger Neville-Neil) – 7:19
"Acid Test" [aka "Dream Worker"] (Bainbridge) – 6:01
"Damnation Alley" (Robert Calvert, Brock, Simon House) – 7:15

Atomhenge CD bonus tracks
"The Damage Of Life" (Brock) – 7:21
"Treadmill / Time We Left" [alternate version] (Brock) – 9:23

Atomhenge bonus CD: "California Brainstorm"
 "Void's End" (Dave Brock) – 5:28
 "Ejection" (Robert Calvert) – 5:58
 "Brainstorm" (Nik Turner) – 8:51
 "Out Of The Shadows" (Bridget Wishart, Brock, Alan Davey) – 8:27
 "Eons" [aka "Snake Dance"] (Davey, Brock, Harvey Bainbridge, Richard Chadwick ) - 4:16
 "Night Of The Hawks" (Brock) - 5:24
 "TV Suicide" (Bainbridge) - 7:09
 "Back In The Box" (Davey, Wishart, Brock, Bainbridge, Chadwick) - 9.13
 "Assassins Of Allah" (Brock, Calvert) – 3:51
 "Propaganda" (Brock) – 1:07
 "Reefer Madness" (Brock, Calvert) – 8:28
 "Images" (Wishart, Brock, Davey) – 6:17

Notes
Disc one:
"Assault and Battery" and "The Golden Void" were renamed for publishing purposes. However, in renaming the tracks, their titles were erroneously transposed.
Although "Heads" forms the middle section of "Time We Left (This World Today)", it is banded as a separate track on the CD.
"Damnation Alley" has a different middle section to the Quark, Strangeness and Charm studio version, this one being a reggae influenced piece that would be worked into "The Camera That Could Lie" from It Is the Business of the Future to Be Dangerous album.

Personnel
Hawkwind
Bridget Wishart – vocals
Dave Brock – electric guitar, keyboards, vocals
Harvey Bainbridge – keyboards, vocals
Alan Davey – bass guitar, vocals
Simon House – violin
Richard Chadwick – drums

Credits
Disc one: Tracks 3-7 recorded live at Palace Theatre, Los Angeles, CA, USA, 10 October 1989
Disc two: Recorded live at Omni Theatre, Oakland, CA, USA, 16 December 1990

Release history
June 1991: GWR, GWLP104, UK
July 1992: Castle Communications, CLACD303, UK/Germany
July 1999: Castle Communications, ESMCD739, UK CD digipak
November 2012: Atomhenge (Cherry Red) Records, ATOMCD 21034

References

Hawkwind live albums
1991 live albums